Angarkha is an outer robe with long sleeves which was worn by men in South Asia.  By the 19th-century it had become the generally accepted attire of an educated man in public. It had evolved from the Persian cape balaba or chapkan as a result of being given a more Indian form in the late medieval or early modern era.

Etymology
Angarkha comes from the Sanskrit , meaning 'body-protector'.

See also 
Achkan
Bagalbandi
Dashiki
Tunic
Jama costume
Kurta

References

Indian clothing
Rajasthani clothing
Bangladeshi clothing
Nepalese clothing
Pakistani clothing
Punjabi clothing